The Horse with the Flying Tail is a 1960 American documentary film by Walt Disney Productions, that won the Best Documentary award at the 33rd Academy Awards.  The movie is about the palomino horse, Nautical, who won the team gold medal at the 1959 Pan American Games. It was released theatrically on a double bill with Swiss Family Robinson, and was later broadcast on Walt Disney's Wonderful World of Color in 1964.

The movie portrays this horse as having been a nondescript stock horse, however, he was sired by an American Quarter Horse named Muchacho de Oro out of an Army Remount mare of mostly Thoroughbred breeding.

This horse's registered name was Pelo de Oro, which was given to him at birth. He became an open jumper and was shown in the national horse show circuit in the United States. Open jumpers compete for scores based on faults (if a jump is refused or a rail knocked down) and time elapsed to complete the course. Prior to his Olympic fame, he had a reputation as a temperamental jumper who was inclined to stop at water-and-ditch jumps. Such refusals would disqualify a jumper from an event. His nickname among competitors was "Sneaky Pete" for those reasons.

He was an excellent jumper (when willing), however, and when he cleared a fence, Sneaky Pete consistently would raise his tail in the characteristic fashion shown in the photograph displayed from the film. That uplifted tail, raised so high, was repeated by the horse for each faultless jump and spectators at horse shows relied upon this signal from the horse to record his scores, without waiting for the results from the judges. Hence the title of the film about his career.

When he was obtained by Hugh Wiley, Wiley enlisted the help of the United States Equestrian Team coach, Bertalan de Nemethy, and together the two men trained the horse to be the Olympic-level open jumper he became. "Sneaky Pete" then became known as "Nautical" and was ridden regularly by members of the U. S. Equestrian Team in international competitions.

See also
 List of American films of 1960

References

External links
 The Horse with the Flying Tail at the Internet Movie Database
 
 

1960 films
Films about horses
1960s English-language films
American documentary films
Best Documentary Feature Academy Award winners
Horse sports in film
1960 documentary films
Disney documentary films
1959 Pan American Games
Equestrian at the Pan American Games
Walt Disney Pictures films
Films produced by Walt Disney
Films scored by William Lava
Documentary films about horses
Palomino horses
1960s American films